Bottomley and its homophone Bottomly are English surnames. They come from the placename formed by combining geographic terms "bottom" and "ley", and which refers to two small settlements each on opposite sides of a hill near Walsden and Halifax, West Yorkshire. It first appears in written records from 1277. Notable people with these surnames include:

Arthur Bottomley (1907–1995), British Labour politician
Christine Bottomley (born 1979), English actress
Gordon Bottomley (1874–1948), English poet
Horatio Bottomley (1860–1933), British journalist, newspaper proprietor and fraudster, MP for Hackney South
James Bottomley (diplomat) (1920–2013), British diplomat 
James Thomson Bottomley (1845–1926), British physicist
Jim Bottomley (1900–1959), baseball player
John Bottomley, Canadian singer-songwriter
John Bottomly, claimant in Bottomly v. Passamaquoddy Tribe
John Wallace Bottomley (1934–2017), English television presenter, better known as John Noakes
Laura Bottomley, American electrical engineer
Norman Bottomley, senior Royal Air Force commander
Peter Bottomley (born 1944), British Conservative politician
Susan Bottomly (born 1950), aka International Velvet, American model and actress
Virginia Bottomley (born 1948), British politician
William Bottomley (1882–1966), Unitarian minister in Melbourne, Australia
William Lawrence Bottomley (1883–1951), American architect

Fictional
 Bottomly, disruptive student in Australian radio comedy Yes, What?

See also
Bottomley Home Girls' High School, Bangladesh
Bottomley projection
Bothamley

References

English-language surnames